is a train station on the Osaka Metro Yotsubashi Line in Nishinari-ku, Osaka, Japan].

Layout
There are two side platforms with two tracks on the first basement.

See also
 List of railway stations in Japan

External links

  
  

Osaka Metro stations
Railway stations in Japan opened in 1942